Meleagros is a genus of beetles in the family Carabidae, containing the following species:

 Meleagros burmanensis Morvan, 2004
 Meleagros coeruleus Kirschenhofer, 1999
 Meleagros sikkimensis Andrewes
 Meleagros sinicola Morvan, 2006

References

Platyninae